Melanohalea nilgirica is a species of foliose lichen in the family Parmeliaceae. Found in India, it was described as a new species in 2005 by lichenologists Pradeep Divakar and Dalip Kumar Upreti. It is characterized by flat, dot-like pseudocyphellae that are flush with the lobe surface, white capitate soralia, and presence of caperatic acid. This is the only known occurrence of this compound in the genus Melanohalea.

References

nilgirica
Lichen species
Lichens described in 2005
Lichens of India
Taxa named by Pradeep Kumar Divakar
Taxa named by Dalip Kumar Upreti